The  is a railway line in Kyushu, Japan, connecting Meinohama Station in Fukuoka, Fukuoka (and via a subway through service, Fukuoka itself) to Karatsu Station in Karatsu, Saga, and from Yamamoto Station in Karatsu to Imari Station in Imari, Saga. Trains from Karatsu to Imari use the Karatsu Line to Yamamoto.

Route data
Operators and distances
JR Kyushu
From Meinohama to Karatsu: 
From Yamamoto to Imari: 
Track gauge: 
Stations: 29
Double-track: From Meinohama to Chikuzen-Maebaru
Electrified track: Meinohama to Nishi-Karatsu only; Yamamoto to Imari is unelectrified

Station list

Eastern section
●: Stops, ｜: Does not stop
Rapid Service: Stops at every station on the Kūkō Line

Western section
All trains running on this section stop at all stations.

Rolling stock
 103-1500 series six-car EMUs (since 1982)
 303 series six-car EMUs (since 22 January 2000)
 305 series six-car EMUs (since February 2015)

A fleet of six new 305 series six-car electric multiple unit (EMU) commuter trains was introduced on the Chikuhi Line from February 2015.

History
The Kita-Kyushu Railway opened the Fukuyoshi to Hamasaki section in 1923, extending it west to Higashi-Karatsu (situated on the east bank of the Matsuura River, opposite the Karatsu Line on the west bank) by 1925 and east to Hakata by 1926. The line was again extended west to Yamamoto where it junctioned with the Karatsu line (establishing Higashi-Karatsu as a reversing station in the process) in 1929, and to Imari in 1935. The company was nationalised in 1937 after which Japanese Government Railways (JGR) designated the track as the Chikuhi Line.

In 1983, the Hakata to Meinohama section was closed and replaced by a link to the Fukuoka City Subway Airport Line. At the same time, the original Nijinomatsubara to Yamamoto section closed.

References

 
Lines of Kyushu Railway Company
1067 mm gauge railways in Japan